is a railway station located in the city of  Gifu,  Gifu Prefecture,  Japan, operated by the private railway operator Meitetsu.

Lines

Station layout

Hosobata Station has two elevated opposed side platforms with the station building underneath. The station is unattended.

Platforms

Adjacent stations

History
Hosobata Station opened on January 21, 1926. The station was rebuilt with elevated tracks in December 1979.

Surrounding area
Japan National Route 156

See also
 List of Railway Stations in Japan

External links

  

Railway stations in Japan opened in 1926
Stations of Nagoya Railroad
Railway stations in Gifu Prefecture